Charlie O'Connell (born 19 December 2002) is an English footballer who plays as a defender or midfielder for  club Peterborough United.

Career
O'Connell made his senior debut as a substitute in a 4–1 League One win over Doncaster Rovers on 9 May 2021.

Career statistics

References

External links

2002 births
Living people
English footballers
Association football midfielders
Peterborough United F.C. players
Kettering Town F.C. players
Woking F.C. players
English Football League players
National League (English football) players